Profiteering is a pejorative term for the act of making a profit by methods considered unethical.

Overview
Business owners may be accused of profiteering when they raise prices during an emergency (especially a war). The term is also applied to businesses that play on political corruption to obtain government contracts.

Some types of profiteering are illegal, such as price fixing syndicates, for example on fuel subsidies (see British Airways price-fixing allegations), and other anti-competitive behaviour. Some are restricted by industry codes of conduct, e.g. aggressive marketing of products in the Third World such as baby milk (see Nestlé boycott).

Types of profiteering
Price fixing
Price gouging
War profiteering

Laws 
Profiteering is illegal in several countries, including but not limited to:
UK: Chapter 1 of the Competition Act 1998
Germany: § 291 StGB (Criminal Code) – up to 10 years' jail maximum penalty
Austria: § 154 StGB – up to 5 years' jail maximum penalty

See also

 Hoarding (economics)
 Business ethics
 Price gouging
 Product sabotage
 Rent seeking
 Supracompetitive pricing
 Ticket scalping
 Usury

Example cases
British Airways price-fixing allegations

References

Business terms
Profit